Port Glaud is an administrative district of Seychelles located on the northwestern coast of the island of Mahé. It is 25 km² and has a population of 2174 (2002 census). The main village is Port Glaud. The district contains two marine parks; Bay Ternay & Port Launay. The offshore islands of Thérèse Island and Conception Island are part of Port Glaud District.

References

 
Districts of Seychelles
Mahé, Seychelles